Ricardo Enriquez Reyes Jr. (born April 12, 1950), commonly known as Ricky Reyes or Mother Ricky, is a Filipino hairdresser, philanthropist, and businessman. He is the owner of the Ricky Reyes chain of salons and host of the television program "Gandang Ricky Reyes".

Biography
The money he earned from sweeping floors was used as capital for his first beauty parlor in 1970. Reyes now has a 44-branch network of Gandang Ricky Reyes salons.

Philanthropy
Reyes’ philanthropic work began in 1984 when he initiated the "Isang Gunting, Isang Suklay" ("One Scissor, One Comb") program which gave free livelihood training to the people of Dasmariñas, Cavite. "We started with giving free haircuts," says Reyes, "but then I remembered the lesson about teaching people how to fish..." This led to the foundation of the Ricky Reyes Learning Institute (RRLI) where he makes education accessible to youth unable to afford college education. The vocational school offers a range of courses in hotel and restaurant services, as well as technical courses in cosmetology conducted by TESDA-certified professionals.

In 2010, Reyes was cited by Forbes magazine as one of the 48 Heroes of Philanthropy list in the Asia-Pacific region. He was selected for his work on health care and job training, particularly involving CHILD Haus (Center for Health Improvement and Life Development), a halfway house for poor, cancer-stricken children from provinces who are seeking treatment in Metro Manila hospitals and for leading a team of volunteers in feeding about 50,000 victims of Tropical Storm Ondoy for two weeks.

Controversy
In 2015, Renato Nocos, a former employee of Reyes' chain of salons, filed a discrimination case against his employer. Reyes fired Nocos after he found out that he is positive with Human Immunodeficiency Virus (HIV). The camp of Reyes denied the claim. In February 2016, the National Labor Relations Commission had found Reyes guilty on the said case. Reyes ordered to reinstate Nocos in his job and pay 600,000 pesos worth of back wages and benefits.

Filmography

Television
Magandang Umaga (ABS-CBN 2, 1987-1989)
Beauty Secrets (IBC 13, 1988–1989)
Beauty School (RPN; 1989–1994)
Beauty School Plus (RPN; 1994–2005)
Teka, Teka (RPN, 1996?)
Magandang Tanghali Bayan (ABS-CBN 2, 1998-2005) - guest/himself
Unang Hirit (GMA 7, 1999 – present) - guest/himself 
Kapuso Mo Jessica Soho (GMA 7, 2005 – present) - featured/himself *Magpakailanman: The Ricky Reyes Story (GMA 7, 2007) – guest/himself
Umagang Kay Ganda (ABS-CBN 2, 2008-2020) - guest/himself 
Gandang Ricky Reyes (QTV 2005–2011; GMA News TV 2011–2020)
It's Showtime (ABS-CBN 2, 2013-2020) - guest celebrity jurado
Powerhouse (GMA 7, 2014)
The Ryza Mae Show (GMA 7, 2015) 
Tunay Na Buhay (GMA 7, 2015)
Chinx Positive (ONE PH, 2015–present) - guest/himself 
Magandang Buhay (ABS-CBN 2, 2016-2020; Kapamilya Channel & A2Z 11, 2020 – present) - guest/himself 
Mars (GMA News TV 27, 2017)
Ang Pinaka (GMA News TV 27 "now GTV 27", 2018-2020) - featured/himself
Sarap Di Ba? (GMA 7, 2019) - guest/himself
Mag Badyet Tayo (ONE PH, 2019) - guest/himself 
Mars Pa More (GMA 7, 2020) - guest/himself
Raket Science (ONE PH, 2020–present) - guest/himself 
Pera Paraan (GMA 7, 2021) - guest/himself

Awards and nominations

References

External links

1950 births
Living people
People from Manila
Businesspeople from Metro Manila
Filipino LGBT businesspeople
20th-century Filipino businesspeople
Hairdressers
Filipino philanthropists
Filipino socialites
Filipino television personalities
Filipino people of Spanish descent
21st-century Filipino businesspeople
GMA Network personalities